Quizartinib (AC220) is a small molecule receptor tyrosine kinase inhibitor, originally from Ambit Biosciences and later acquired by Daiichi Sankyo, that is currently under development for the treatment of acute myeloid leukaemia. Quizartinib is sold under the brand name Vanflyta in Japan. Its molecular target is FLT3, also known as CD135 which is a proto-oncogene.

Flt3 mutations are among the most common mutations in acute myeloid leukaemia due to internal tandem duplication of Flt3. The presence of this mutation is a marker of adverse outcome.


Mechanism
Specifically, quizartinib selectively inhibits class III receptor tyrosine kinases, including FMS-related tyrosine kinase 3 (FLT3/STK1), colony-stimulating factor 1 receptor (CSF1R/FMS), stem cell factor receptor (SCFR/KIT), and platelet derived growth factor receptors (PDGFRs).

Mutations cause constant activation of the FLT3 pathway resulting in inhibition of ligand-independent leukemic cell proliferation and apoptosis.

Clinical trials
It reported good results in 2012 from a phase II clinical trial for refractory AML - particularly in patients who went on to have a stem cell transplant.

, it has completed five clinical trials, and another seven are active.

References

Experimental cancer drugs
Receptor tyrosine kinase inhibitors
4-Morpholinyl compunds
Isoxazoles
Ureas
Tert-butyl compounds
Ethers